The 2018 McGrath Cup was a Gaelic football competition in the province of Munster, played by county teams.

Just three county teams completed in 2018 after the withdrawals of Tipperary, Limerick, and Kerry. Cork were the winners.

The cup was won by Cork after a 3–13 to 3–12 win in the final.

Format

Three teams compete. Each team plays the other teams once, earning 2 points for a win and 1 for a draw. The top two teams play in the final.

Group stage

The final group game was cancelled, as Cork and Clare had already reached the final.

Final

References

External links
Fixtures and Results

McGrath Cup
McGrath Cup